James Cassels may refer to:

 James Cassels (British Army officer) (1907–1996), Chief of the British General Staff 1965–1968 
 James Cassels (politician) (1877–1972), British Conservative Member of Parliament 1922–1929 and 1931–1935

See also
 Jim Cassell, British football director